Tafjorden is an inner branch of the Norddalsfjorden/Storfjorden in Fjord Municipality in Møre og Romsdal county, Norway. It is part of the UNESCO World Heritage Site West Norwegian Fjords. The fjord is located southeast of the village of Sylte, the municipal center of Norddal Municipality.

History

When Olaf II of Norway fled up the Storfjorden to escape the forces of Canute the Great, he and his men journeyed up the fjord until he passed through the Norddalsfjorden and reached the Tafjorden. From there they passed north up the Valldalen valley and across the mountains to Lesja on his way to exile in Russia.

The rock landed in the Tafjorden which created a local tsunami which killed 40 people living on the shore of the fjord. It was one of the worst natural disasters in Norway in the 20th century.

See also
 List of Norwegian fjords

References

Fjords of Møre og Romsdal
Fjord (municipality)